10th ADG Awards
February 11, 2006

Period or Fantasy Film: 
 Memoirs of a Geisha 

Contemporary Film: 
 Walk the Line 

The 10th Art Directors Guild Awards, given on 11 February 2006, honored the best art directors of 2005.

Winners

Film

Contemporary
 David J. Bomba – Walk the Line
Laurence Bennett – Crash
Dennis Gassner – Jarhead
Mark Teldesley – The Constant Gardener
Dan Weil – Syriana

Fantasy or Period
John Myhre – Memoirs of a Geisha
Jim D. Bissell – Good Night, and Good Luck.
Nathan Crowley – Batman Begins
Grant Major – King Kong
Alex McDowell – Charlie and the Chocolate Factory

Television
Single Camera Series:
Joseph Bennett – Rome for Episode 1
Multiple Camera Series:
John Sabato – Mad TV for Episode 1106
Television Movie or Miniseries:
Stuart Wurtzel – Empire Falls
Awards Show, Variety or Music Special, or Documentary:
Roy Christopher – 77th Academy Awards
Commercial, Promo or PSA:
Jeremy Reed – Bud Light

Art Directors Guild Awards
2005 film awards
2005 television awards
2005 guild awards
2006 in American cinema